Silver Drive-In may refer to:

 Silver Drive-In (Johnstown) in Windber, Pennsylvania
 Silver Drive-In (Fenton),  former Drive-In  in Fenton, Michigan